This is a list of 103 species in Dendrocerus, a genus of ceraphronids and megaspilids in the family Megaspilidae.

Dendrocerus species

 Dendrocerus aberrans Alekseev, 1994 i c g
 Dendrocerus acrossopteryx Dessart, 1985 i c g
 Dendrocerus aequatorialis Dessart, 1999 i c g
 Dendrocerus africanus (Risbec, 1958) i c g
 Dendrocerus alaskensis (Ashmead, 1902) i c g
 Dendrocerus aliberti (Risbec, 1950) i c g
 Dendrocerus aloha Dessart, 1994 i c g
 Dendrocerus amamensis Takada, 1974 i c g
 Dendrocerus americanus (Ashmead, 1893) i c g
 Dendrocerus angustus Dessart, 1999 i c g
 Dendrocerus anneckei Dessart, 1985 i c g
 Dendrocerus anomaliventris (Ashmead, 1893) i c g
 Dendrocerus antennalis (Kieffer, 1907) i c g
 Dendrocerus aphidum (Rondani, 1877) i c g
 Dendrocerus applanatus Dessart, 1972 i c g
 Dendrocerus araucanus Dessart, 1999 i c g
 Dendrocerus australicus (Dodd, 1914) i c g
 Dendrocerus basalis (Thomson, 1858) i c g
 Dendrocerus bicolor (Kieffer, 1907) g
 Dendrocerus bifoveatus (Kieffer, 1907) i c g
 Dendrocerus bispinosus (Kieffer, 1907) i c g
 Dendrocerus breadalbimensis (Kieffer, 1907) g
 Dendrocerus caelebs Dessart, 1999 i c g
 Dendrocerus californicus (Ashmead, 1893) i c
 Dendrocerus carpenteri (Curtis, 1829) i c g
 Dendrocerus castaneus (Kieffer, 1907) i c g
 Dendrocerus chilocori (Ishii, 1951) i c g
 Dendrocerus chloropidarum Dessart, 1990 i c g
 Dendrocerus ciuthan Dessart, 1994 i c g
 Dendrocerus constrictus (Brues, 1909) i c g
 Dendrocerus conwentziae Gahan, 1919 i c g b
 Dendrocerus cyclopeus Dessart, 1995 i c g
 Dendrocerus dalhousieanus Sharma, 1983 i c g
 Dendrocerus dauricus (Chumakova, 1956) i c g
 Dendrocerus dubiosus (Kieffer, 1907) g
 Dendrocerus dubitatus (Brues, 1937) i c g
 Dendrocerus ergensis (Ghesquiere, 1960) i c g
 Dendrocerus femoralis Dodd, 1914 i c g
 Dendrocerus flavipennis (Kieffer, 1907) i c g
 Dendrocerus flavipes Kieffer, 1907 i c g
 Dendrocerus floridanus (Ashmead, 1881) i c g
 Dendrocerus fulvaster Alekseev, 1994 i c g
 Dendrocerus fuscipes (Ratzeburg, 1852) g
 Dendrocerus hadrophthalmus Dessart, 1994 i c g
 Dendrocerus halidayi (Curtis, 1829) i c g
 Dendrocerus henkvlugi Dessart, 1975 i c g
 Dendrocerus incertissimus Dessart, 1999 i c g
 Dendrocerus indicus (Mani, 1939) i c g
 Dendrocerus katmandu Dessart, 1999 i c g
 Dendrocerus koyamae (Ishii, 1951) i c g
 Dendrocerus laevis (Ratzeburg, 1852) i c g
 Dendrocerus laticeps (Hedicke, 1929) i c g
 Dendrocerus latifrons (Muesebeck, 1959) i c g
 Dendrocerus leucopidis (Muesebeck, 1959) i c g
 Dendrocerus liebscheri Dessart, 1972 i c g
 Dendrocerus mexicali Dessart, 1999 i c g
 Dendrocerus molestus Dessart, 1999 i c g
 Dendrocerus mucronifer Dessart, 1999 i c g
 Dendrocerus natalicius Dessart, 1985 i c g
 Dendrocerus natalicus Dessart, 1985 g
 Dendrocerus noumeae Dessart, 1967 i c g
 Dendrocerus omostenus Dessart, 1979 i c g
 Dendrocerus ornatus (Dodd, 1914) i c g
 Dendrocerus pacificus (Ashmead, 1893) i c g
 Dendrocerus pallipes (Harrington, 1899) i c g
 Dendrocerus papu Dessart, 1999 i c g
 Dendrocerus paradoxus Dessart & Gaerdenfors, 1985 i c g
 Dendrocerus penmaricus (Ashmead, 1893) i c g
 Dendrocerus perlucidus Alekseev, 1983 i c g
 Dendrocerus phallocrates Dessart, 1987 i c g
 Dendrocerus picipes (Ashmead, 1893) i c g
 Dendrocerus propodealis Dessart, 1973 i c g
 Dendrocerus psyllarum Dessart, 1983 i c g
 Dendrocerus punctativentris (Dodd, 1914) i c g
 Dendrocerus punctipes (Boheman, 1832) i c g
 Dendrocerus pupparum (Boheman, 1832) i c g
 Dendrocerus pykarus Sharma, 1983 i c g
 Dendrocerus ramicornis (Boheman, 1832) i c g
 Dendrocerus rectangularis (Kieffer, 1907) i c g
 Dendrocerus remaudierei Dessart, 1974 i c g
 Dendrocerus rodhaini (Bequaert, 1913) i c g
 Dendrocerus rosularum (Ratzeburg, 1852) i c g
 Dendrocerus rufipes (Thomson, 1858) g
 Dendrocerus rufiventris (Ashmead, 1887) i c g
 Dendrocerus sanmateoensis Dessart, 1966 i c g
 Dendrocerus sergii Alekseev, 1994 i c g
 Dendrocerus serricornis (Boheman, 1832) i c g
 Dendrocerus sexdentatus (Ashmead, 1893) i c g
 Dendrocerus solarii (Kieffer, 1907) i c g
 Dendrocerus sordidus Dodd, 1914 i c g
 Dendrocerus splendidus (Dodd, 1914) i c g
 Dendrocerus stigma (Nees von Esenbeck, 1834) i c g
 Dendrocerus stigmatus (Say, 1836) i c g
 Dendrocerus subtruncatus (Kieffer, 1907) i c g
 Dendrocerus sylviae Dessart & Cancemi, 1987 i c g
 Dendrocerus tibialis Dessart, 1995 i c g
 Dendrocerus triticum (Taylor, 1860) i c g
 Dendrocerus ulmicola Dessart & Gaerdenfors, 1985 i c g
 Dendrocerus variegatus Dodd, 1914 i c g
 Dendrocerus variipes Dodd, 1914 i c g
 Dendrocerus wollastoni (Dodd, 1920) i c g
 Dendrocerus zhelochovtsevi Alekseev, 1979 i c g
 Dendrocerus zoticus Dessart, 1995 i c g

Data sources: i = ITIS, c = Catalogue of Life, g = GBIF, b = Bugguide.net

References

Dendrocerus
Articles created by Qbugbot